Cameronidion is a monotypic genus of Malaysian comb-footed spiders containing the single species, Cameronidion punctatellum. It was first described by J. Wunderlich in 2011, and is found in Malaysia.

See also
 List of Theridiidae species

References

Monotypic Araneomorphae genera
Spiders of Asia
Theridiidae